A. Sheridan Delépine (1855-1921) was a Swiss bacteriologist and pathologist. He was professor of pathology and bacteriology at Owens College, Manchester and then at the Victoria University of Manchester. Delépine was appointed when Julius Dreschfeld moved from pathology to a chair in the principles and practice of medicine in 1891. His Swiss accent made understanding his lectures rather hard, but his reputation among the students was high. He organized the work of his department with great energy and then organized and opened a public health laboratory in 1891. This laboratory contributed much to the investigation of public health and problems of sanitation. Medical students were taught practical hygiene and bacteriology in the laboratory and could obtain a diploma in public health. Delépine was from 1891 to 1910 professor of comparative pathology and bacteriology (he also taught pathology 1891-1904), then professor of public health and bacteriology from 1910 to 1921.

See also
November 1900#November 17, 1900 (Saturday)

References

The Book of Manchester and Salford written for the ninety-seventh annual meeting of the British Medical Association in July 1929. Manchester: George Falkner & Sons, 1929; pp. 60–61

1855 births
1921 deaths
Swiss pathologists
Swiss bacteriologists